Kria may refer to:

 Kria, a place featured in The Hitchhiker's Guide to the Galaxy
 KRIA (FM), a radio station (103.9 FM) licensed to serve Plainview, Texas, United States
 Keriah, the tearing of garments as part of bereavement in Judaism